Vuolit Spielgajávri is a lake in the municipality of Kautokeino-Guovdageaidnu in Troms og Finnmark county, Norway. The lake Bajit Spielgajávri lies just  to the west of this lake.

See also
List of lakes in Norway

References

Kautokeino
Lakes of Troms og Finnmark